The 2018 Appalachian State Mountaineers football team represented Appalachian State University during the 2018 NCAA Division I FBS football season. The Mountaineers were led by sixth-year head coach Scott Satterfield and played their home games at Kidd Brewer Stadium. They competed as a member of the East Division of the Sun Belt Conference. They finished the season 11–2, 7–1 in Sun Belt play to be co-champions of the East Division with Troy. Due to their head-to-head win over Troy, they represented the East Division in the inaugural Sun Belt Championship Game where they defeated West Division champion Louisiana to become Sun Belt Champions for the third consecutive year and first time outright. They were invited to the New Orleans Bowl where they defeated Middle Tennessee.

On December 3, head coach Scott Satterfield resigned to become the head coach at Louisville. He finished at Appalachian State with a six year record of 51–24. Defensive line coach Mark Ivey led the Mountaineers in the New Orleans Bowl.

On December 13, Appalachian State hired North Carolina State offensive coordinator Eliah Drinkwitz as their new head coach.

Previous season
The Mountaineers finished the 2017 season 9–4, 7–1 in Sun Belt play to earn a share of the Sun Belt championship for the second consecutive year. They received an invite to the Dollar General Bowl where they defeated Toledo for the second consecutive year in a bowl game.

Preseason

Award watch lists
Listed in the order that they were released

Sun Belt coaches poll
On July 19, 2018, the Sun Belt released their preseason coaches poll with the Mountaineers predicted to finish as champions of the East Division.

Preseason All-Sun Belt Teams
The Mountaineers had seven players selected to the preseason all-Sun Belt teams. Defensive back Clifton Duck was selected as the preseason defensive player of the year.

Offense

1st team

Jalin Moore – RB

Collin Reed – TE

Victor Johnson – OL

Defense

1st team

Anthony Flory – LB

Clifton Duck – DB

2nd team

Myquon Stout – DL

Tae Hayes – DB

Recruiting
The Mountaineers signed 24 recruits.

Roster

Schedule

Game summaries

at Penn State

at Charlotte

Gardner–Webb

South Alabama

at Arkansas State

Louisiana

at Georgia Southern

at Coastal Carolina

at Texas State

Georgia State

Troy

Louisiana (Sun Belt Championship Game)

vs. Middle Tennessee (New Orleans Bowl)

Rankings

References

Appalachian State
Appalachian State Mountaineers football seasons
Sun Belt Conference football champion seasons
New Orleans Bowl champion seasons
Appalachian State Mountaineers football